The crustacean order Tanaidacea (known as tanaids) make up a minor group within the class Malacostraca. There are about 940 species in this order.

Description
Their carapace covers the first two segments of the thorax. There are three pairs of limbs on the thorax; a small pair of maxillipeds, a pair of large clawed gnathopods, and a pair of pereiopods adapted for burrowing into the mud. Unusually among crustaceans, the remaining six thoracic segments have no limbs at all, but each of the first five abdominal segments normally carry pleopods. The final segment is fused with the telson and carries a pair of uropods.

The gills lie on the inner surface of the carapace. The thoracic limbs wash water towards the mouth, filtering out small particles of food with the mouthparts or maxillipeds. Some species actively hunt prey, either as their only food source, or in combination with filter feeding.

Habitat
Most are marine, but some are also found in freshwater coastal habitat or estuaries. The majority of species are bottom-dwellers in shallow water environments, but a few live in very deep water, exceeding for some species . In some deep sea environment, they represent the most abundant and diverse fauna to be found.

Life cycle
Tanaids do not undergo a true planktonic stage. The early developmental period is spent while young are within the marsupium of the mother. Subsequently, post-larvae, called mancas, emerge as epibenthic forms. Some species are hermaphroditic.

Taxonomy
The order Tanaidacea is divided into the following sub-orders, superfamilies and families:

 Suborder Anthracocaridomorpha †
 Family Anthracocarididae † Brooks, 1962 emend. Schram, 1979
 Family Niveotanaidae † Polz, 2005

 Suborder Apseudomorpha
 Superfamily Apseudoidea Leach, 1814 (incl. former superfamily Jurapseudoidea)
 Family Apseudellidae Gutu, 1972
 Family Apseudidae Leach, 1814
 Family Eucryptocaridae Heard et al. 2020
 Family Gigantapseudidae Kudinova-Pasternak, 1978
 Family Jurapseudidae † Schram, Sieg & Malzahn, 1986
 Family Kalliapseudidae Lang, 1956
 Family Metapseudidae Lang, 1970
 Family Numbakullidae Gutu & Heard, 2002
 Family Ophthalmapseudidae Heard et al. 2020
 Family Pagurapseudidae Lang, 1970
 Family Pagurapseudopsididae Gutu, 2006
 Family Parapseudidae Gutu, 1981
 Family Protoapseudoidae Heard et al. 2020
 Family Sphaeromapseudidae Larsen, 2012
 Family Sphyrapodidae Gutu, 1980
 Family Tanzanapseudidae Bacescu, 1975
 Family Whiteleggiidae Gutu, 1972
 Genus Palaeotanais † Reiff, 1936

 Superfamily Cretitanaoidea † Schram, Sieg, Malzahn, 1983
 Family Cretitanaidae † Schram, Sieg & Malzahn, 1986

 Suborder Tanaidomorpha
 Superfamily Neotanaoidea Sieg, 1980
 Family Neotanaidae Lang, 1956
 Superfamily Paratanaoidea Lang, 1949
 Family Agathotanaidae Lang, 1971
 Family Akanthophoreidae Sieg, 1986
 Family Alavatanaidae † Vonk & Schram, 2007
 Family Anarthruridae Lang, 1971
 Family Colletteidae Larsen & Wilson, 2002
 Family Cryptocopidae Sieg, 1977
 Family Heterotanoididae Bird, 2012
 Family Leptocheliidae Lang, 1973
 Family Leptognathiidae Sieg, 1976
 Family Mirandotanaidae Blazewicz-Paszkowycz & Bamber, 2009
 Family Nototanaidae Sieg, 1976
 Family Paratanaidae Lang, 1949
 Family Paratanaoidea incertae sedis
 Family Pseudotanaidae Sieg, 1976
 Family Pseudozeuxidae Sieg, 1982
 Family Tanaellidae Larsen & Wilson, 2002
 Family Tanaissuidae Bird & Larsen, 2009
 Family Tanaopsidae Błażewicz-Paszkowycz & Bamber, 2012
 Family Teleotanaidae Bamber, 2008
 Family Typhlotanaidae Sieg, 1984
 Superfamily Tanaidoidea Nobili, 1906
 Family Tanaididae Nobili, 1906

References

External links

 
Malacostraca
Crustacean orders